Laatzen is a town in the district of Hanover, in Lower Saxony, Germany. It is situated directly south of Hanover.

Division of the town
In 1964, the municipalities of Laatzen (nowadays about 22,000 inhabitants) and Grasdorf (3,500 inh.) were merged into the town of Laatzen. In 1974 the towns of Rethen (8,100 inh.), Gleidingen (4,300 inh.) and Ingeln-Oesselse (3,700 inh.) were joined to the town.

Twin towns – sister cities

Laatzen is twinned with:
 Le Grand-Quevilly, France
 Gubin, Poland
 Waidhofen an der Ybbs, Austria

See also
Metropolitan region Hannover-Braunschweig-Göttingen-Wolfsburg

References

External links

  
 Official site of Gleidingen

Hanover Region